The Marin Arts Council was the official Marin County, California, United States, arts council.
It officially dissolved in October 2012.
The Mission of the Marin Arts Council was to nurture the cultural life of Marin County by serving as the central arts resource and service agency.

The Marin Arts Council was run under the California state arts council, the California Arts Council (CAC).

MarinArts.org is now the home of MarinArts, an Arts & Culture guide that connects and supports the arts community in Marin.

Arts councils of California
Organizations based in Marin County, California
Organizations disestablished in 2012
2012 disestablishments in California